E Battery Royal Horse Artillery is a Close Support Battery of 1st Regiment Royal Horse Artillery. It is currently based in Purvis Lines in Larkhill Camp.

History
E Battery Royal Horse Artillery was formed as E Troop on 1 November 1794.

19th century
E Troop saw action in the Peninsular War in 1811 and also at the Battle of Waterloo.  Between 1815 and 1856, the Troop saw service in England, Ireland and the Crimea.  By this time E Troop had been renamed D Troop. In 1877, D Troop was re-designated as E Battery RHA. In 1878, E Battery was deployed to the Second Afghan War.

World War I

In 1914, E Battery was sent to France as part of the BEF, equipped with QF 13-pounder guns. At 0930 hours on 22 August 1914, northeast of Harmignies in Belgium, No. 4 gun of E Battery fired the first British artillery rounds on the Western Front in World War I, E Battery went on to fight in many of the battles on the Western Front and then joined the Army of Occupation.

Between the World Wars
E Battery moved to India in 1926. In 1938, E Battery merged with the A Battery to form A/E Battery prior to the formation of 1 RHA.

World War II
In 1939,  E Battery fought in Belgium and France, before being evacuated from St Valery in June 1940. The battery later deployed to the Western Desert. 1st Regiment Royal Horse Artillery was reorganised as A Battery, B Battery and E Battery. The Battery saw action in the campaigns in the Western Desert and Italy up to 1945.

Post war
In 1946, E Battery deployed to Egypt and later The Battery went to Palestine. Between 1952 and 1965, E Battery was stationed in Germany. By 1965, E Battery deployed to the Aden Protectorate. In 1990, the Battery provided soldiers for a combined A/B/E Battery which fought in the Gulf War. Later, in 1992, E Battery moved to Assaye Barracks in Tidworth Camp and converted to the AS-90 artillery gun. In the late 1990s, E Battery deployed on to the Balkans. In 2004, E Battery deployed on Operation Telic 4 to Basra, Iraq to train the Iraqi Border Police. By 2005, E Battery deployed to Cyprus for UNFICYP operations and in 2009, the Battery deployed as part of Operation Herrick 11 while in 2013, E Battery deployed as part of Operation Herrick 18.

Future
Under the Army 2020 plan, the battery re-roled from a light gun battery to an AS-90 battery.

Current Role
E Battery is currently a Close Support Battery which uses the AS-90 Self-propelled artillery Guns. The Battery is sub-divided into four troops:
Gardiner's Troop: (Gun Troop)
Salamanca Troop: (Gun Troop)
Waterloo Troop: (Echelon Troop)
Mons Troop: (Observation Party Troop (Fire Support Teams and Joint Fires Cell)

See also

British Army
Royal Artillery
Royal Horse Artillery
List of Royal Artillery Batteries

References

Bibliography

External links
 

Royal Horse Artillery batteries
Royal Artillery batteries
1794 establishments in Great Britain
Military units and formations established in 1794